Engineers Designers Fabricators, Incorporated also known as EDF, Inc is an engineering and technical services company located in Riviera Beach, Florida, United States.

History
EDF, Inc started in 1978 by servicing Pratt & Whitney and other United Technologies Corporation divisions with engineering and drafting support. In 2005 the company started a public marketing campaign and in 2006 started bidding on United States government contracts. In December 2007, the company was changed from a Veteran-Owned Small business to a Women-Owned Small Business.

February 2009 EDF started marketing a previously In-house Software called EDF LaborWorks. EDF LaborWorks received Trademark registration in May 2010.

Services
EDF specializes in:

Gas turbine Jet engine Test Facility Design
Rocket engine Test Facility Design
Industrial and Commercial Facility Design

Major Clients
Some of EDF Incorporated's major clients are:

United Technologies Corporation Companies
Pratt & Whitney
Pratt and Whitney, West Palm Beach, FL
PW Power Systems Inc. a MHI group company, formerly Pratt and Whitney Power Systems, Hartford, CT
Pratt and Whitney Canada
Sikorsky Aircraft, West Palm Beach, FL
Perry Technologies
NASA, Stennis Space Center
Wyle Laboratories
Lockheed Martin
Atomic Energy Commission
Tinker AFB
Hamilton Standard
Titan - L3 Communications - NAVAIR PSEF
SNC-Lavalin - Air France

References

Engineering consulting firms of the United States